Lupita López (born Blanca Guadalupe López Maldonado; October 13, 1978) is a Mexican bullfighter and matador. Born in Mérida, Yucatán, Lopez has been reported as deciding to be a bullfighter when she was eleven years old. She became a matador, aged 32, in 2011.  

She came from a family of bullfighters. As of March 2011, Lopez was one of only four female professional bullfighters.

See also 

 List of female bullfighters

References

Living people
Date of birth missing (living people)
Female bullfighters
Mexican bullfighters
Sportspeople from Mérida, Yucatán
1978 births